The Emschergenossenschaft is the oldest and biggest public German water board, („Wasserwirtschaftsverband”) located in Essen (North Rhine-Westphalia/Germany) and responsible for the 865 km2 Emscher catchment with 2.2 million citizens. The main tasks are wastewater discharge and treatment, flood protection, groundwater management, settlement of claims caused by hard coal mining, river restoration and protection of ecosystems.

History

Origins and early development 

In the North of Germany the merging of adjoining land owners along rivers and creeks in cooperatives had a long tradition from the 13th century on. In the German Rhine catchment, downstream of Cologne, the industrialization in the 19th century was leading to a renaissance of the alliance ideas. Until the middle of the 19th century the river Emscher (running from the spring close to Dortmund in western direction to the Rhine) was a small meandering lowland river of 109 km and the villages along the river had only a few thousand citizens. The improvement of steam engines and the construction of the Cologne-Minden trunk line in the 1840s enabled the economic development and the excavation of vertical mine shafts in the northern Ruhr from the 1850s on. That was resulting in severe environmental and health problems due to mining subsidence: The hard coal excavation in some hundred meters depth caused geological reactions at the surface, too. Locally, the sinking was leading over a stretch of 100 years to 30 m of mining-induced subsidence. The Emscher catchment area suffered from “subsidence funnels” where waste water, surface run-off and water from the creeks gathered and digested. From the river Ruhr (running in parallel in the south of the Emscher) water supply was installed by pumping stations to the northern cities from the 1870s on but the water carried germs and contaminations, too. Along the Emscher and its tributaries putrid smell, polluted water and flooding were not only restraining economic developments but also causing diseases and epidemics like typhus and malaria. From 1885 on legislative initiatives started to develop catchment-wide solutions and finally in 1899 the mining companies, industrial players and the Lord Mayors of the growing cities established the Emschergenossenschaft to organize the regional water drainage. In the same year the water supply was improved by the foundation of the Ruhrtalsperrenverein that was responsible for the construction and operation of drinking water basins to support the industry and citizens.

The municipalities were responsible for the inner city drainage systems and interconnection points were jointly defined where the Emschergenossenschaft took over responsibility. Those were normally the sub catchment parts where underground sewer systems were impossible as the mining subsidence would have caused damages continuously and waste water would have infiltrated in groundwater and soil.

In the following years – based on the Emschergenossenschaft act from 1904, a special water board act – the technical initial equipment and extension of the river and tributaries took place in the 865 km2 catchment area, cutting the meanders (the Emscher was shortened from 109 km to today 81 km), deepening the runways and lining them with concrete, constructing dikes and pumping stations, relocating the Emscher mouth to guarantee downward slope and establishing waste water treatment plants. All discharge from industry, mines and households as well as rain, surface water and natural discharge were collected and drained in these new “concrete streams”. All costs were divided between the “users” of the Emscher system, depending on the volume and load of waste water or drainage capacity or causer (for example the mining companies).

Between 1906 and 1914 the catchment area changed completely as in parallel to the technical transformation of the river system with 7.000 hectares drained land the shipping waterway Rhine-Herne Canal was constructed over a stretch of 46 km to connect the coal and steel district via the Rhine to the North Sea. This waterway was located partly in the former Emscher course and is often only separated by a dyke from the Emscher.

Progressing coal mining aggravated environmental problems and permanent pumping and re-construction was needed since starting the initial equipment. In the 1920s the Emschergenossenschaft operated 30 waste water treatment plants but changed the system to more centralized solutions in the following years, starting 1927 with a facility in Bottrop and (after the second relocation of the Emscher mouth 1949) the development of the central treatment plant Emscher mouth in the 1970s.

Later development 

The coal crisis that emerged in the 1960s was resulting in shutdown of most mines until the 1980s and as a follow-up the mining subsidence decreased and nearly stopped in the 1990s. Within the frame of the Internationale Bauausstellung Emscher Park from 1989 to 1999 (established as a political program for structural changes from the North Rhine-Westphalian government) the Emscher restoration was announced as a so-called lighthouse project.

The Emschergenossenschaft with its administrative, political and industrial members decided to re-develop the whole Emscher system towards „second hand nature“ – a real restoration compared to the times before industrialization is impossible. The stretch was fixed for the time frame 1990 to 2020 with an investment budget of 4.5 billion €. First step was the construction respectively upgrading of 4 centralized waste water treatment plants in Dortmund, Bottrop, Duisburg and at the Emscher mouth.

The second step is the construction of a 400 km waste water sewer system in parallel to the “concrete streams” and the river Emscher itself; tubes had been impossible due to mining subsidence before. Step by step compartments of the sewer system are connected to the waste water treatment plants.

After connecting the tubes the remaining “concrete streams” are re-developed as a third step. The historical development has been leading to a regional system of 350 km open waste water courses within corridors, fenced and secured to prevent accidents and damage. These isolated lines are on the other hand a benefit as they now enable the Emschergenossenschaft to re-develop green belts with restored water courses in these corridors. In other metropolitan areas normally water courses had disappeared in the underground sewer system which was impossible in the Emscher catchment area. The planning process was based on catchment wide masterplan strategies and public involvement, especially for huge construction sites. The Emschergenossenschaft cooperated in many EU funded transnational projects for example on regional metropolitan park demands, with Dutch institutions on flood prevention and public participation processes, on climate change mitigation and adaptation  and with further networks on pharmaceutical residues in surface waters.

The Emscher restoration programme is planned to be ready with a first basic ecological equipment until 2020.

Responsibilities 

Responsibilities and tasks of the Emschergenossenschaft are defined in the act „Emschergenossenschaftsgesetz“ (Emscher GG ), enacted July 14, 1904 and adapted until 2013:

 Management of runoff, flood prevention at open water courses and in the sub catchments;
 Maintenance of open water courses and related facilities;
 Ecological restoration of technically altered water courses;
 Groundwater management;
 Compensation of mining impacts on ecological or water management related changes;
 Waste water disposal;
 Waste disposal of waste from water management services;
 Water quality management;
 Scientific work related to water management challenges;
 Support of drinking water supply, water for industrial use and use of hydropower

The Emschergenossenschaft is working in an administrative collectivity with the Lippeverband, a water board established in 1926 in a neighboring river catchment area. Together, more than 1.500 employees work for both water boards, around 900 of them belong to the Emschergenossenschaft. Both public water boards together are the biggest water management and service provider in Germany.

Governance 

The North Rhine-Westphalian water boards are statutory bodies, working in public-private partnership as non-profit institutions.

The Emschergenossenschaft has an administration that is governed by a board of 3 managing directors, elected for 5 years each. The election happens on the level of associates that have representatives in an annual assembly, coming from

 19 municipalities,
 170 commercial and infrastructure companies and
 9 mining companies.

The number of representatives per member depends on the number of citizens in the 19 municipalities and on the volume of waste water “produced” by the companies and mines.

The supervisory authority is the Ministry for Climate Protection, Environment, Agriculture, Conservation and Consumer Protection of the State of North Rhine-Westphalia (MKULNV). German water boards are not formal authorities but have to receive permissions and approvals for construction works etc. They are independent in financial and internal management but depend on regulatory decrees regarding water acts.

Catchment area 

The Emschergenossenschaft is working in the 865 km2 catchment area of the Emscher with the municipalities (from east to west)

 Holzwickede
 Dortmund
 Small parts of Witten, Waltrop and Lünen
 Castrop-Rauxel
 Recklinghausen
 Herten
 Herne
 Bochum
 Essen
 Mülheim
 Gelsenkirchen
 Gladbeck
 Bottrop
 Oberhausen
 Duisburg
 Dinslaken
 Voerde

The catchment is historically divided since cutting the Emscher main stream from its original estuary twice, first in 1906 from the original mouth in Duisburg and 1949 again by shifting the mouth to Dinslaken. The former parts of the catchment area in Duisburg and Oberhausen are drained artificially and the waste water is – after treatment – pumped into the river Rhine. These sub catchments are called “Alte Emscher” and “Kleine Emscher”. The third shift of the Emscher mouth (under construction 2014–2018) has been leading to the municipality of Voerde as a new member in the Emschergenossenschaft.

Data 

 Members of the Emschergenossenschaft: 201
 Catchment area: 865 km2
 Population: approx. 2.2 Mio.
 Water courses: 341 km
 Waste water sewers: 328 km (currently more under construction, in 2018 approx. 400 km)
 Dykes: 117 km
 Waste water treatment plants: 5 (in total 4.8 Mio. people equivalents)
 Pumping stations: 132
 Part of catchment area drained by pumps (polder areas): 37.8%
 Flood plains: 23

References

External links
 

Water board
Water in Germany